Battle: Los Angeles – Original Motion Picture Soundtrack is the soundtrack to the 2011 film of the same name directed by Jonathan Liebesman. It was released on March 8, 2011.

Track listing

Composed and Conducted by Brian Tyler. Performed by The Hollywood Studio Symphony. Brian Tyler performed on guitars, percussion, bass, piano and electric cello.

Critical reception

James Christopher Monger of Allmusic gave the soundtrack a review:

References

External links
 
 Soundtrack review for 'Battle: Los Angeles' at Tracksounds

2011 soundtrack albums
Brian Tyler soundtracks
Science fiction film soundtracks
Action film soundtracks